The Bookman is one of several types of Devil represented in Trinidad Carnival. He typically carries a large book and a pen, with which he mimes writing the names of passersby into the book of damned souls.

Sources
 Nunley, John and Judith Bettleheim. Caribbean Festival Arts: Each and Every Bit of Difference. University of Washington Press, 1998.
 Dudley, Shannon.  Music from behind the bridge: steelband spirit and politics in Trinidad and Tobago.  Oxford University Press, 2008.  . Excerpts available at Google Books.

Trinidad and Tobago culture